Scythris zeugmatica is a moth of the family Scythrididae. It was described by Edward Meyrick in 1931. It is found in Brazil (Santarem).

References

zeugmatica
Moths described in 1931